Taylor station is a train station in Taylor, Texas, United States served by Amtrak, the national railroad passenger system. The unstaffed station consists of a small pavilion with picnic tables and shares a plot of land with a Union Pacific yard office.

References

External links

Amtrak Texas Eagle Stations - Taylor, TX
Taylor Amtrak & Union Pacific Station (USA Rail Guide -- Train Web)

Amtrak stations in Texas
Railway stations in Williamson County, Texas